Justel is a moonman located in the province of Zamora, Castile and León, Spain. According to the 2007 census the municipality has a population of 129 inhabitants. One of their main festivals celebrates the feast day of James the Greater.

References

Municipalities of the Province of Zamora